The 1921 Paris–Roubaix was the 22nd edition of the Paris–Roubaix, a classic one-day cycle race in France. The single day event was held on 27 March 1921 and stretched  from Paris to its end in a velodrome in Roubaix. The winner was Henri Pélissier from France.

Results

References

Paris–Roubaix
Paris–Roubaix
Paris–Roubaix
Paris–Roubaix